Nikulinskoye is a rural locality (a village) in Nesterovskoye Rural Settlement, Sokolsky District, Vologda Oblast, Russia. The population was 54 as of 2002.

Geography 
Nikulinskoye is located 35 km northwest of Sokol (the district's administrative centre) by road. Myalitsyno is the nearest rural locality.

References 

Rural localities in Sokolsky District, Vologda Oblast